Louisville City School District is a public school district serving students in Louisville, Ohio, United States.  Serving over 1,000 students, the district is centered on the city of Louisville and includes most of the surrounding Nimishillen Township.

Schools

Elementary schools
Louisville Elementary School - newly constructed and opened in 2012, the new Louisville Elementary replaces the former Louisville Elementary School, Fairhope Elementary School, and Pleasant Grove Elementary School.
North Nimishillen Elementary School

Middle schools
Louisville Middle School - newly constructed and opened in 2004, this building replaces the former Louisville Middle School, built in 1924.

High schools
Louisville High School (Ohio) - originally built in 1964, this school has undergone numerous additions and renovations, in 1967, 2004, and 2011.
Rated by U.S. News & World Report with Silver medal for one of the Best High Schools in the nation for testing and college readiness

Former Schools
Fairhope Elementary School (closed and demolished in 2012)
Pleasant Grove Elementary School (closed and demolished in 2012)

State Report Card
2016-2017 Report Card

References

External links
 Official Site

School districts in Stark County, Ohio